Put It on the Line is an album by Ghostface Killah & Trife Da God, Recorded in 2004-2005. Tracks number 16 and 18 were recorded in 2001. released on Ghostface's own Starks Enterprises label on November 18, 2005 (see 2005 in music). According to Trife's Myspace profile, the album has sold over 100,000 copies independently. Trife's former T.M.F. bandmates Kryme Life and Tommy Whispers make various guest appearances.

Track listing
"Cocaine Trafficking" Ghostface Killah & Trife Diesel
"Put It on the Line" Trife Diesel
"Struggle" Ghostface Killah
"Hustle Hard" Trife Diesel
"Event" Trife Diesel 
"Gangsta Shit" Trife Diesel feat. Tommy Whispers
"Fire" Ghostface Killah & Trife Diesel (produced by Jim Bond)
"Project Soap Operas" Trife Diesel feat. Cryme Life & Tommy Whispers
"War" Trife Diesel
"Out Da Way" Ghostface Killah feat. Shawn Wigz
"Drugz" Trife Diesel
"Milk Em'" Ghostface Killah & Trife Diesel
"Late Night Arrival" Ghostface Killah & Trife Diesel feat. Shawn Wigz
"Man Up" Ghostface Killah & Trife Diesel feat. Sun God
"Game Time" Trife Diesel feat. Tommy Whispers
"The Watch" Ghostface Killah feat. Raekwon
"Ghost & Giancana" Ghostface Killah feat. Kool G Rap
"The Sun" Ghostface Killah feat. Raekwon, Slick Rick, & RZA

CD/DVD
A limited edition of the album includes a DVD, recorded in New York City on, according to the cover, October 9, 2005. The latter includes the following:
Intro
Criminology
Saturday Night
Interlude
Ice Cream feat. Cappadonna
Nutmeg
Apollo Kids
Child's Play
Interlude
Holla
Grab The Mic Masta Killa
Forth [sic] Chamber feat. Killah Priest
Liquid Swords GZA
Shimmy Shimmy Ya–ODB R.I.P.
Run
Interlude/Sun God freestyle
Be Easy
Be This Way
Girls to the Stage
Mighty Healthy
Stay True
Outro

2005 albums
Ghostface Killah albums
Collaborative albums